Surfing on Sine Waves is a studio album by Polygon Window, a pseudonym for the English electronic music producer Richard D. James, better known by the alias Aphex Twin. It was originally released on 11 January 1993 by Warp. It is the second release in Warp's Artificial Intelligence series. The 2001 reissue edition includes the previously unreleased tracks "Portreath Harbour" and "Redruth School".

Background
The cover of the album features a photograph of Chapel Porth beach in Cornwall, where James spent time with his sisters as a child; James thanks the seaside village in the liner notes. The title Surfing on Sine Waves was chosen by Warp founder Rob Mitchell after James mentioned that "loads of people I knew growing up in Cornwall were poser surfers and I didn't wanna hang around with them."

Reissue track "Redruth School" references James's alma mater, while "Portreath Harbour" references the Cornish port.

Critical reception

Ned Raggett of AllMusic praised Surfing on Sine Waves as "a great collection of abstract electronic/dance madness, caught somewhere between the driftiness of his more ambient works at the time and the rave-minded nuttiness of 'Digeridoo.'" Mark Richard-San of Pitchfork wrote, "Catchy, melodic and memorable tracks are what made the Aphex Twin so wonderful at his best; Surfing on Sine Waves has a handful of these, albeit in rough, embryonic form."

In 2012, Fact placed Surfing on Sine Waves at number 26 on its list of the "100 Best Albums of the 1990s". In 2017, Pitchfork placed it at number 26 on its list of the "50 Best IDM Albums of All Time". Writing for Pitchfork, Andrew Nosnitsky said, "These days, Surfing doesn't get mentioned as often as the louder, more ambitious, 'proper' Aphex records that would follow, but it's easily as refined on a technical level—and maybe even more emotionally rewarding."

Track listing

Personnel
Credits adapted from liner notes.
 Richard D. James – writing, production, arrangement, programming, engineering, location recording
 The Designers Republic – design
 Samantha Robinson – photography

References

External links
 
 
 Surfing on Sine Waves at Warp

1993 albums
Acid techno albums
Aphex Twin albums
Warp (record label) albums
Wax Trax! Records albums
TVT Records albums
SME Records albums
Albums with cover art by The Designers Republic